Blackton is a surname. It is most common in the United States but there is a high density in Canada as well. Notable people with the surname include:

J. Stuart Blackton (1875–1941), English-American film producer, considered the "father of American animation"
Paula Blackton (1881–1930), American actress